The 2011 FIG World Cup circuit in Rhythmic Gymnastics includes one category A event (Sofia) and nine category B events. With stopovers in North America, Europe and Asia, the competitions took place on January 29–30 in Montreal (CAN), March 25–27 in Pesaro (ITA), April 15–17 in Kalamata (GRE), April 23–24 in Nizhny Novgorod (RUS), April 28 – May 1 in Portimão (POR), May 6–8 in Kyiv (UKR), May 13–15 in Corbeil-Essonnes (FRA), August 20–21 in Sofia (BUL), August 26–27 in Tel-Aviv (ISR) and September 5–7 in Tashkent (UZB). Two events were open to individual athletes (Montreal and Corbeil-Essonnes), two were open to groups (Nizhny Novgorod and Tel-Aviv) and six were open to both individual athletes and groups. In all of the events, all-around competitions served as qualifications for the finals by apparatus. The world ranking points collected by the competitors at their best four World Cup events added up to a total, and the top scorers in each event were crowned winners of the overall series at the final event in Tashkent, Uzbekistan.

Formats

Medal winners

All-around

Individual

Group all-around

Apparatus

Hoop

Ball

Clubs

Ribbon

5 balls

2 hoops and 3 ribbons

Overall medal table

See also
 2011 FIG Artistic Gymnastics World Cup series

References

Rhythmic Gymnastics World Cup
2011 in gymnastics